Francesco Bracotti (born January 16, 1995 in Turin, Italy) is a professional racing driver from Italy who competes in single seaters.

Racing career

Karting 
Bracotti was 4 years old when he tasted the asphalt the first time, on the go-kart circuit of Cattolica.
After years of amateur experiences between 50 babykart and 60 minikart he jumped to 100 junior category and started doing in 2008 the Piedmont regional championship, ending it in the 1st position.
In 2009 he took part to the Open Masters in the KF3 category and in some races of the WSK championship. He also participated in prestigious international events as Margutti and Industries trophies.
In 2010 he became an official driver of the Tecno Kart team and took part in the World Championship U-18 established by FIA.
Here he stood out with its capacities, in particular on the Spanish circuit of Aragon.
In 2011, again as a bearer of Tecno Kart he took part to the European Championship in Kf2 and, as the previous year, in the World Championship U-18.

Formula Renault 2.0 

In 2012 Bracotti starts his single seaters career taking part in the Italian Formula Renault 2.0 championship as a driver of the team “Green Goblin by Facondini”. In the first collective tests he immediately stands out as a competitive driver for the season.
In Monza, the first meeting of the championship, he gets a seventh and a fourth place; same placement in which he ends the first of the two races in Imola, where he also obtain the fastest lap.
Bracotti goes for the first time on the podium at the Red Bull Ring, in the second of the two races of the weekend. The Italian driver finished the first race in the fifth place, despite starting from the pit lane because of a technical failure, after having obtained the third position in the qualifying practise.
The race in Vallelunga is signed by two retires for Bracotti, who started from the first row in race-1 and was coinvolved in an accident at "cimini" corner.  In race-2 a technical failure to the rear suspension forced him to stop the car.
In end of the championship another retire, caused by engine problems,  in Mugello Circuit made he 4th in the junior ranking, in which he fought for the first position.

Racing Records

Career summary

Formula Renault 2.0 results

References and notes

External links 
 

1995 births
Racing drivers from Turin
Living people